Rudy Pankow is an American actor. He is most known for his role as JJ Maybank on the Netflix teen drama series Outer Banks.

Early life
Pankow was born and raised in Ketchikan, Alaska. He began his interest in acting and production some time in middle school via YouTube. He attended Ketchikan High School where he played soccer and participated in cross-country events. Pankow originally considered going to culinary school, but chose to become an actor and joined a 2016–2017 batch in an acting institute.

After that, Pankow enrolled at Michael Woolson Studios to improve his acting skills. After completion of the acting course, he started performing in theatre to gain more experience. During his time in theatre, he played roles in The Nutcracker, Mary Poppins and Oliver Twist.

Personal life

Pankow has been in a relationship with Elaine Siemak since November 2020.

Filmography

Film

Television

References

External links
 

Living people
American male television actors
Male actors from Alaska
21st-century American male actors
People from Ketchikan, Alaska
American male film actors
American male stage actors